{{DISPLAYTITLE:C4H2}}
The molecular formula C4H2 (molar mass: 50.06 g/mol, exact mass: 50.01565 u) may refer to:

 Diacetylene, or butadiyne
 Propalene, or bicyclo[1.1.0]buta-1,3-diene

Molecular formulas